DYPR-TV (channel 12) is a commercial television station owned and operated by the Philippine Collective Media Corporation. The station's studios are located at the 3rd floor, Tingog Community Center, Real St. cor. Calanipawan Rd., Brgy. Sagkahan, and the transmitter is located at the Remedios Trinidad Romualdez Hospital Compound, Brgy. 96 (Calanipawan), Tacloban, Leyte.

In the 1990s, Channel 12 was a regional affiliate station of the Intercontinental Broadcasting Corporation.

PRTV programs
Note: Some programs are simulcast with sister FM station FMR Tacloban every Monday to Saturday.
 Arangkada (flagship/rolling newscast)
 Arangkada Sais Trenta
 Arangkada Dose Trenta
 Arangkada Singko Trenta
 Isyu at Komentaryo
 Wanted Pangga

Digital television

Digital channels
UHF Channel 50 (689.143 MHz)

Areas of coverage

Primary areas 
 Tacloban
 Leyte

Secondary areas 
 Samar
 Portion of Biliran
 Portion of Southern Leyte
 Portion of Sorsogon

References

Television stations in Tacloban
Mass media in Tacloban
Digital television stations in the Philippines
Television channels and stations established in 2011